This is a list of native amphibians in Indonesia.

Order: Anura
Family: Bombinatoridae Gray, 1825
Genus: Barbourula Taylor and Noble, 1924
Barbourula kalimantanensis Iskandar, 1978
Family: Bufonidae Gray, 1825
Genus: Ansonia Stoliczka, 1870
Ansonia albomaculata Inger, 1960
Ansonia glandulosa Iskandar and Mumpuni, 2004
Ansonia hanitschi Inger, 1960
Ansonia latidisca Inger, 1966
Ansonia leptopus (Günther, 1872)
Ansonia longidigita Inger, 1960
Ansonia minuta Inger, 1960
Ansonia spinulifer (Mocquard, 1890)
Genus: Duttaphrynus Frost, Grant, Faivovich, Bain, Haas, Haddad, de Sá, Channing, Wilkinson, Donnellan, Raxworthy, Campbell, Blotto, Moler, Drewes, Nussbaum, Lynch, Green, and Wheeler, 2006
Duttaphrynus melanostictus (Schneider, 1799)
Duttaphrynus sumatranus (Peters, 1871)
Duttaphrynus totol (Ohler, 2010)
Duttaphrynus valhallae (Meade-Waldo, 1909)
Genus: Ingerophrynus Frost, Grant, Faivovich, Bain, Haas, Haddad, de Sá, Channing, Wilkinson, Donnellan, Raxworthy, Campbell, Blotto, Moler, Drewes, Nussbaum, Lynch, Green, and Wheeler, 2006
Ingerophrynus biporcatus (Gravenhorst, 1829)
Ingerophrynus celebensis (Günther, 1859)
Ingerophrynus claviger (Peters, 1863)
Ingerophrynus divergens (Peters, 1871)
Ingerophrynus parvus (Boulenger, 1887)
Ingerophrynus quadriporcatus (Boulenger, 1887)
Genus: Leptophryne Fitzinger, 1843
Leptophryne borbonica (Tschudi, 1838)
Leptophryne cruentata (Tschudi, 1838)
Genus: Pelophryne Barbour, 1938
Pelophryne guentheri (Boulenger, 1882)
Pelophryne rhopophilia Inger and Stuebing, 1996
Pelophryne signata (Boulenger, 1895)
Genus: Phrynoidis Fitzinger in Treitschke, 1842
Phrynoidis asper (Gravenhorst, 1829)
Phrynoidis juxtasper (Inger, 1964)
Genus: Pseudobufo Tschudi, 1838
Pseudobufo subasper Tschudi, 1838
Genus: Rentapia Chan, Grismer, Zachariah, Brown, and Abraham, 2016
Rentapia hosii (Boulenger, 1892)
Genus: Rhinella Fitzinger, 1826
Rhinella marina (Linnaeus, 1758)
Genus: Sabahphrynus Matsui, Yambun, and Sudin, 2007
Sabahphrynus maculatus (Mocquard, 1890)
Genus: Sigalegalephrynus
Sigalegalephrynus mandailinguensis Smart, Sarker, Arifin, Harvey, Sidik, Hamidy, Kurniawan, and Smith, 2017
Sigalegalephrynus minangkabauensis Smart, Sarker, Arifin, Harvey, Sidik, Hamidy, Kurniawan, and Smith, 2017
Sigalegalephrynus burnitelonensis Sarker, Wostl, Thammachoti, Sidik, Hamidy, Kurniawan, and Smith, 2019
Sigalegalephrynus gayoluesensis Sarker, Wostl, Thammachoti, Sidik, Hamidy, Kurniawan, and Smith, 2019
Sigalegalephrynus harveyi Sarker, Wostl, Thammachoti, Sidik, Hamidy, Kurniawan, and Smith, 2019
Family: Ceratobatrachidae Boulenger, 1884
Subfamily: Alcalinae Brown, Siler, Richards, Diesmos, and Cannatella, 2015
Genus: Alcalus Brown, Siler, Richards, Diesmos, and Cannatella, 2015
Alcalus baluensis (Boulenger, 1896)
Alcalus rajae (Iskandar, Bickford, and Arifin, 2011)
Subfamily: Ceratobatrachinae Boulenger, 1884
Genus: Cornufer Tschudi, 1838
Cornufer batantae (Zweifel, 1969)
Cornufer bimaculatus (Günther, 1999)
Cornufer cheesmanae (Parker, 1940)
Cornufer cryptotis (Günther, 1999)
Cornufer paepkei (Günther, 2015)
Cornufer papuensis (Meyer, 1875)
Cornufer punctatus (Peters and Doria, 1878)
Cornufer wuenscheorum (Günther, 2006)
Family: Dicroglossidae Anderson, 1871
Subfamily: Dicroglossinae Anderson, 1871
Genus: Fejervarya Bolkay, 1915
Fejervarya cancrivora (Gravenhorst, 1829)
Fejervarya iskandari Veith, Kosuch, Ohler, and Dubois, 2001
Fejervarya limnocharis (Gravenhorst, 1829)
Fejervarya schlueteri (Werner, 1893)
Fejervarya verruculosa (Roux, 1911)
Genus: Limnonectes Fitzinger, 1843
Limnonectes arathooni (Smith, 1927)
Limnonectes asperatus (Inger, Boeadi, and Taufik, 1996)
Limnonectes blythii (Boulenger, 1920)
Limnonectes dammermani (Mertens, 1929)
Limnonectes finchi (Inger, 1966)
Limnonectes grunniens (Latreille, 1801)
Limnonectes heinrichi (Ahl, 1933)
Limnonectes hikidai Matsui and Nishikawa, 2014
Limnonectes ibanorum (Inger, 1964)
Limnonectes ingeri (Kiew, 1978)
Limnonectes kadarsani Iskandar, Boeadi, and Sancoyo, 1996
Limnonectes kenepaiensis (Inger, 1966)
Limnonectes khasianus (Anderson, 1871)
Limnonectes kong Dehling and Dehling, 2017
Limnonectes kuhlii (Tschudi, 1838)
Limnonectes larvaepartus Iskandar, Evans, and McGuire, 2014
Limnonectes leporinus Andersson, 1923
Limnonectes macrodon (Duméril and Bibron, 1841)
Limnonectes macrognathus (Boulenger, 1917)
Limnonectes malesianus (Kiew, 1984)
Limnonectes microdiscus (Boettger, 1892)
Limnonectes microtympanum (Van Kampen, 1907)
Limnonectes modestus (Boulenger, 1882)
Limnonectes palavanensis (Boulenger, 1894)
Limnonectes paramacrodon (Inger, 1966)
Limnonectes rhacodus (Inger, Boeadi, and Taufik, 1996)
Limnonectes shompenorum Das, 1996
Limnonectes sinuatodorsalis Matsui, 2015
Limnonectes sisikdagu McLeod, Horner, Husted, Barley, and Iskandar, 2011
Limnonectes timorensis (Smith, 1927)
Limnonectes tweediei (Smith, 1935)
Subfamily: Occidozyginae Fei, Ye, and Huang, 1990
Genus: Occidozyga Kuhl and Van Hasselt, 1822
Occidozyga baluensis (Boulenger, 1896)
Occidozyga celebensis Smith, 1927
Occidozyga floresiana Mertens, 1927
Occidozyga lima (Gravenhorst, 1829)
Occidozyga semipalmata Smith, 1927
Occidozyga sumatrana (Peters, 1877)
Occidozyga tompotika Iskandar, Arifin, and Rachmanasah, 2011
Family: Hylidae Rafinesque, 1815
Family: Megophryidae Bonaparte, 1850
Genus: Leptobrachella Smith, 1925
Leptobrachella baluensis Smith, 1931
Leptobrachella dringi (Dubois, 1987)
Leptobrachella gracilis (Günther, 1872)
Leptobrachella hamidi (Matsui, 1997)
Leptobrachella juliandringi Eto, Matsui, and Nishikawa, 2015
Leptobrachella mjobergi Smith, 1925
Leptobrachella natunae (Günther, 1895)
Leptobrachella picta (Malkmus, 1992)
Leptobrachella serasanae Dring, 1983
Genus: Leptobrachium Tschudi, 1838
Leptobrachium abbotti (Cochran, 1926)
Leptobrachium hasseltii Tschudi, 1838
Leptobrachium hendricksoni Taylor, 1962
Leptobrachium ingeri Hamidy, Matsui, Nishikawa, and Belabut, 2012
Leptobrachium montanum Fischer, 1885
Leptobrachium waysepuntiense Hamidy and Matsui, 2010
Genus: Megophrys Kuhl and Van Hasselt, 1822
Megophrys baluensis (Boulenger, 1899)
Megophrys edwardinae Inger, 1989
Megophrys montana (Kuhl and Van Hasselt, 1822)
Megophrys nasuta (Schlegel, 1858)
Megophrys parallela Inger and Iskandar, 2005
Family: Microhylidae Günther, 1858 (1843)
Subfamily: Asterophryinae Günther, 1858
Genus: Aphantophryne
Aphantophryne parkeri (Loveridge, 1955)
Genus: Asterophrys Tschudi, 1838
Asterophrys eurydactyla (Zweifel, 1972)
Asterophrys foja (Günther, Richards, and Tjaturadi, 2016)
Asterophrys leucopus Richards, Johnston, and Burton, 1994
Asterophrys marani (Günther, 2009)
Asterophrys pullifer (Günther, 2006)
Asterophrys slateri Loveridge, 1955
Asterophrys turpicola (Schlegel, 1837)
Genus: Austrochaperina Fry, 1912
Austrochaperina basipalmata (Van Kampen, 1906)
Austrochaperina blumi Zweifel, 2000
Austrochaperina kosarek Zweifel, 2000
Austrochaperina macrorhyncha (Van Kampen, 1906)
Austrochaperina minutissima Günther, 2009
Austrochaperina punctata (Van Kampen, 1913)
Austrochaperina rudolfarndti Günther, 2017
Genus: Barygenys Parker, 1936
Genus: Callulops Boulenger, 1888
Callulops biakensis Günther, Stelbrink, and von Rintelen, 2012
Callulops boettgeri (Méhely, 1901)
Callulops dubius (Boettger, 1895)
Callulops fojaensis Oliver, Richards, and Tjaturadi, 2012
Callulops fuscus (Peters, 1867)
Callulops kampeni (Boulenger, 1914)
Callulops kopsteini (Mertens, 1930)
Callulops valvifer (Barbour, 1910)
Callulops wondiwoiensis Günther, Stelbrink, and von Rintelen, 2012
Callulops yapenensis Günther, Stelbrink, and von Rintelen, 2012
Genus: Choerophryne Van Kampen, 1914
Choerophryne amomani Günther, 2008
Choerophryne arndtorum Günther, 2008
Choerophryne laurini (Günther, 2000)
Choerophryne microps Günther, 2008
Choerophryne nigrescens Günther, 2008
Choerophryne proboscidea Van Kampen, 1914
Choerophryne rostellifer (Wandolleck, 1911)
Choerophryne tubercula (Richards, Johnston, and Burton, 1992)
Choerophryne variegata (Van Kampen, 1923)
Genus: Cophixalus Boettger, 1892
Cophixalus balbus Günther, 2003
Cophixalus biroi (Méhely, 1901)
Cophixalus cheesmanae Parker, 1934
Cophixalus humicola Günther, 2006
Cophixalus monosyllabus Günther, 2010
Cophixalus montanus (Boettger, 1895)
Cophixalus pictus Kraus, 2012
Cophixalus rajampatensis Günther, Richards, Tjaturadi, and Krey, 2015
Cophixalus salawatiensis Günther, Richards, Tjaturadi, and Krey, 2015
Cophixalus tetzlaffi Günther, 2003
Cophixalus tridactylus Günther, 2006
Genus: Copiula Méhely, 1901
Copiula derongo (Zweifel, 2000)
Copiula exspectata Günther, 2002
Copiula major Günther, 2002
Copiula obsti Günther, 2002
Copiula pipiens Burton and Stocks, 1986
Genus: Gastrophrynoides Noble, 1926
Gastrophrynoides borneensis (Boulenger, 1897)
Genus: Hylophorbus Macleay, 1878
Hylophorbus nigrinus Günther, 2001
Hylophorbus picoides Günther, 2001
Hylophorbus rufescens Macleay, 1878
Hylophorbus sextus Günther, 2001
Hylophorbus tetraphonus Günther, 2001
Hylophorbus wondiwoi Günther, 2001
Genus: Mantophryne Boulenger, 1897
Mantophryne lateralis Boulenger, 1897
Genus: Oninia Günther, Stelbrink, and von Rintelen, 2010
Oninia senglaubi Günther, Stelbrink, and von Rintelen, 2010
Genus: Oreophryne Boettger, 1895
Oreophryne albopunctata (Van Kampen, 1909)
Oreophryne alticola Zweifel, Cogger, and Richards, 2005
Oreophryne asplenicola Günther, 2003
Oreophryne atrigularis Günther, Richards, and Iskandar, 2001
Oreophryne biroi (Méhely, 1897)
Oreophryne brevicrus Zweifel, 1956
Oreophryne brevirostris Zweifel, Cogger, and Richards, 2005
Oreophryne celebensis (Müller, 1894)
Oreophryne choerophrynoides Günther, 2015
Oreophryne clamata Günther, 2003
Oreophryne crucifer (Van Kampen, 1913)
Oreophryne flava Parker, 1934
Oreophryne frontifasciata (Horst, 1883)
Oreophryne furu Günther, Richards, Tjaturadi, and Iskandar, 2009
Oreophryne habbemensis Zweifel, Cogger, and Richards, 2005
Oreophryne idenburgensis Zweifel, 1956
Oreophryne jeffersoniana Dunn, 1928
Oreophryne kapisa Günther, 2003
Oreophryne mertoni (Roux, 1910)
Oreophryne minuta Richards and Iskandar, 2000
Oreophryne moluccensis (Peters and Doria, 1878)
Oreophryne monticola (Boulenger, 1897)
Oreophryne oviprotector Günther, Richards, Bickford, and Johnston, 2012
Oreophryne pseudasplenicola Günther, 2003
Oreophryne roedeli Günther, 2015
Oreophryne rookmaakeri Mertens, 1927
Oreophryne sibilans Günther, 2003
Oreophryne terrestris Zweifel, Cogger, and Richards, 2005
Oreophryne unicolor Günther, 2003
Oreophryne variabilis (Boulenger, 1896)
Oreophryne waira Günther, 2003
Oreophryne wapoga Günther, Richards, and Iskandar, 2001
Oreophryne wolterstorffi (Werner, 1901)
Oreophryne zimmeri Ahl, 1933
Genus: Sphenophryne Peters and Doria, 1878
Sphenophryne brevicrus (Van Kampen, 1913)
Sphenophryne cornuta Peters and Doria, 1878
Sphenophryne schlaginhaufeni Wandolleck, 1911
Genus: Xenorhina Peters, 1863
Xenorhina adisca Kraus and Allison, 2003
Xenorhina anorbis (Blum and Menzies, 1989)
Xenorhina arfakiana (Blum and Menzies, 1989)
Xenorhina arndti Günther, 2010
Xenorhina bidens Van Kampen, 1909
Xenorhina bouwensi (De Witte, 1930)
Xenorhina eiponis Blum and Menzies, 1989
Xenorhina fuscigula (Blum and Menzies, 1989)
Xenorhina gigantea Van Kampen, 1915
Xenorhina lanthanites (Günther and Knop, 2006)
Xenorhina macrodisca Günther and Richards, 2005
Xenorhina macrops Van Kampen, 1913
Xenorhina mehelyi (Boulenger, 1898)
Xenorhina minima (Parker, 1934)
Xenorhina multisica (Blum and Menzies, 1989)
Xenorhina obesa (Zweifel, 1960)
Xenorhina ocellata Van Kampen, 1913
Xenorhina ophiodon (Peters and Doria, 1878)
Xenorhina oxycephala (Schlegel, 1858)
Xenorhina parkerorum Zweifel, 1972
Xenorhina rostrata (Méhely, 1898)
Xenorhina scheepstrai (Blum and Menzies, 1989)
Xenorhina schiefenhoeveli (Blum and Menzies, 1989)
Xenorhina similis (Zweifel, 1956)
Xenorhina varia Günther and Richards, 2005
Subfamily: Chaperininae Peloso, Frost, Richards, Rodrigues, Donnellan, Matsui, Raxworthy, Biju, Lemmon, Lemmon, and Wheeler, 2016
Genus: Chaperina Mocquard, 1892
Chaperina fusca Mocquard, 1892
Subfamily: Kalophryninae Mivart, 1869
Genus: Kalophrynus Tschudi, 1838
Kalophrynus bunguranus (Günther, 1895)
Kalophrynus eok Das and Haas, 2003
Kalophrynus heterochirus Boulenger, 1900
Kalophrynus intermedius Inger, 1966
Kalophrynus meizon Zug, 2015
Kalophrynus minusculus Iskandar, 1998
Kalophrynus pleurostigma Tschudi, 1838
Kalophrynus punctatus Peters, 1871
Kalophrynus subterrestris Inger, 1966
Subfamily: Microhylinae Günther, 1858 (1843)
Genus: Glyphoglossus Gunther, 1869 "1868"
Glyphoglossus brooksii (Boulenger, 1904)
Glyphoglossus capsus (Das, Min, Hsu, Hertwig, and Haas, 2014)
Glyphoglossus volzi (Van Kampen, 1905)
Genus: Kaloula Gray, 1831
Kaloula baleata (Müller, 1836)
Kaloula pulchra Gray, 1831
Genus: Metaphrynella Parker, 1934
Metaphrynella sundana (Peters, 1867)
Genus: Microhyla Tschudi, 1838
Microhyla achatina Tschudi, 1838
Microhyla berdmorei (Blyth, 1856)
Microhyla borneensis Parker, 1928
Microhyla heymonsi Vogt, 1911
Microhyla malang Matsui, 2011
Microhyla orientalis Matsui, Hamidy, and Eto, 2013
Microhyla palmipes Boulenger, 1897
Microhyla perparva Inger and Frogner, 1979
Microhyla petrigena Inger and Frogner, 1979
Microhyla superciliaris Parker, 1928
Genus: Micryletta Dubois, 1987
Micryletta inornata (Boulenger, 1890)
Genus: Phrynella Boulenger, 1887
Phrynella pulchra Boulenger, 1887
Superfamily: Myobatrachoidea
Family: Limnodynastidae Lynch, 1969
Genus: Lechriodus Boulenger, 1882
Lechriodus aganoposis Zweifel, 1972
Lechriodus melanopyga (Doria, 1875)
Lechriodus platyceps Parker, 1940
Genus: Limnodynastes Fitzinger, 1843
Limnodynastes convexiusculus (Macleay, 1878)
Family: Myobatrachidae Schlegel, 1850
Genus: Crinia Tschudi, 1838
Crinia remota (Tyler and Parker, 1974)
Genus: Uperoleia Gray, 1841
Uperoleia lithomoda Tyler, Davies, and Martin, 1981
Uperoleia mimula Davies, McDonald, and Corben, 1986
Subfamily: Litoriinae Dubois and Frétey, 2016
Genus: Litoria Tschudi, 1838
Litoria amboinensis (Horst, 1883)
Litoria angiana (Boulenger, 1915)
Litoria arfakiana (Peters and Doria, 1878)
Litoria biakensis Günther, 2006
Litoria capitula (Tyler, 1968)
Litoria chloronota (Boulenger, 1911)
Litoria christianbergmanni Günther, 2008
Litoria congenita (Peters and Doria, 1878)
Litoria darlingtoni (Loveridge, 1945)
Litoria dorsalis Macleay, 1878
Litoria eurynastes Menzies, Richards, and Tyler, 2008
Litoria everetti (Boulenger, 1897)
Litoria gasconi Richards, Oliver, Krey, and Tjaturadi, 2009
Litoria havina Menzies, 1993
Litoria humboldtorum Günther, 2006
Litoria iris (Tyler, 1962)
Litoria lodesdema Menzies, Richards, and Tyler, 2008
Litoria longicrus (Boulenger, 1911)
Litoria mareku Günther, 2008
Litoria megalops Richards and Iskandar, 2006
Litoria micromembrana (Tyler, 1963)
Litoria modica (Tyler, 1968)
Litoria mucro Menzies, 1993
Litoria mystax (Van Kampen, 1906)
Litoria nasuta (Gray, 1842)
Litoria nigrofrenata (Günther, 1867)
Litoria nigropunctata (Meyer, 1875)
Litoria pygmaea (Meyer, 1875)
Litoria quadrilineata Tyler and Parker, 1974
Litoria rothii (De Vis, 1884)
Litoria rubella (Gray, 1842)
Litoria scabra Günther and Richards, 2005
Litoria thesaurensis (Peters, 1877)
Litoria timida Tyler and Parker, 1972
Litoria umarensis Günther, 2004
Litoria umbonata Tyler and Davies, 1983
Litoria verae Günther, 2004
Litoria viranula Menzies, Richards, and Tyler, 2008
Litoria vocivincens Menzies, 1972
Litoria wapogaensis Richards and Iskandar, 2001
Litoria wisselensis (Tyler, 1968)
Litoria wollastoni (Boulenger, 1914)
Subfamily: Pelodryadinae Günther, 1858
Genus: Nyctimystes Stejneger, 1916
Nyctimystes fluviatilis Zweifel, 1958
Nyctimystes granti (Boulenger, 1914)
Nyctimystes humeralis (Boulenger, 1912)
Nyctimystes infrafrenatus (Günther, 1867)
Nyctimystes montanus (Peters and Doria, 1878)
Nyctimystes narinosus Zweifel, 1958
Nyctimystes pulcher (Wandolleck, 1911)
Nyctimystes purpureolatus (Oliver, Richards, Tjaturadi, and Iskandar, 2007)
Nyctimystes sanguinolenta (Van Kampen, 1909)
Genus: Ranoidea Tschudi, 1838
"Ranoidea papua" (Van Kampen, 1909)
Ranoidea aruensis (Horst, 1883)
Ranoidea brongersmai (Loveridge, 1945)
Ranoidea caerulea (White, 1790)
Ranoidea dahlii (Boulenger, 1896)
Ranoidea dorsivena (Tyler, 1968)
Ranoidea elkeae (Günther and Richards, 2000)
Ranoidea eucnemis (Lönnberg, 1900)
Ranoidea fuscula (Oliver and Richards, 2007)
Ranoidea genimaculata (Horst, 1883)
Ranoidea graminea (Boulenger, 1905)
Ranoidea macki (Richards, 2001)
Ranoidea napaea (Tyler, 1968)
Ranoidea pratti (Boulenger, 1911)
Ranoidea rara (Günther and Richards, 2005)
Ranoidea rivicola (Günther and Richards, 2005)
Ranoidea rueppelli (Boettger, 1895)
Family: Pipidae Gray, 1825
Genus: Xenopus Wagler, 1827
Xenopus laevis (Daudin, 1802)
Family: Ranidae Batsch, 1796
"Hylarana" celebensis (Peters, 1872)
"Hylarana" persimilis (Van Kampen, 1923)
Genus: Abavorana Oliver, Prendini, Kraus, and Raxworthy, 2015
Abavorana luctuosa (Peters, 1871)
Genus: Amnirana Dubois, 1992
Amnirana nicobariensis (Stoliczka, 1870)
Genus: Chalcorana Dubois, 1992
Chalcorana chalconota (Schlegel, 1837)
Chalcorana macrops (Boulenger, 1897)
Chalcorana megalonesa (Inger, Stuart, and Iskandar, 2009)
Chalcorana mocquardi (Werner, 1901)
Chalcorana parvaccola (Inger, Stuart, and Iskandar, 2009)
Chalcorana raniceps (Peters, 1871)
Chalcorana rufipes (Inger, Stuart, and Iskandar, 2009)
Genus: Huia Yang, 1991
Huia cavitympanum (Boulenger, 1893)
Huia masonii (Boulenger, 1884)
Huia modiglianii (Doria, Salvidio, and Tavano, 1999)
Huia sumatrana Yang, 1991
Genus: Hylarana Tschudi, 1838
Hylarana erythraea (Schlegel, 1837)
Genus: Lithobates Fitzinger, 1843
Lithobates catesbeianus (Shaw, 1802)
Genus: Meristogenys Yang, 1991
Meristogenys amoropalamus (Matsui, 1986)
Meristogenys kinabaluensis (Inger, 1966)
Meristogenys orphnocnemis (Matsui, 1986)
Meristogenys phaeomerus (Inger and Gritis, 1983)
Meristogenys poecilus (Inger and Gritis, 1983)
Meristogenys whiteheadi (Boulenger, 1887)
Genus: Odorrana Fei, Ye, and Huang, 1990
Odorrana hosii (Boulenger, 1891)
Genus: Papurana Dubois, 1992
Papurana arfaki (Meyer, 1875)
Papurana aurata (Günther, 2003)
Papurana daemeli (Steindachner, 1868)
Papurana elberti (Roux, 1911)
Papurana florensis (Boulenger, 1897)
Papurana garritor (Menzies, 1987)
Papurana grisea (Van Kampen, 1913)
Papurana jimiensis (Tyler, 1963)
Papurana moluccana (Boettger, 1895)
Papurana novaeguineae (Van Kampen, 1909)
Papurana papua (Lesson, 1829)
Papurana supragrisea (Menzies, 1987)
Papurana volkerjane (Günther, 2003)
Genus: Pulchrana Dubois, 1992
Pulchrana baramica (Boettger, 1900)
Pulchrana debussyi (Van Kampen, 1910)
Pulchrana glandulosa (Boulenger, 1882)
Pulchrana laterimaculata (Barbour and Noble, 1916)
Pulchrana picturata (Boulenger, 1920)
Pulchrana rawa (Matsui, Mumpuni, and Hamidy, 2012)
Pulchrana siberu (Dring, McCarthy, and Whitten, 1990)
Pulchrana signata (Günther, 1872)
Genus: Sanguirana Dubois, 1992
Sanguirana sanguinea (Boettger, 1893)
Genus: Staurois Cope, 1865
Staurois guttatus (Günther, 1858)
Staurois latopalmatus (Boulenger, 1887)
Staurois tuberilinguis Boulenger, 1918
Genus: Sumaterana Arifin, Smart, Hertwig, Smith, Iskandar, and Haas, 2018
Sumaterana crassiovis (Boulenger, 1920)
Sumaterana dabulescens Arifin, Smart, Hertwig, Smith, Iskandar, and Haas, 2018
Sumaterana montana Arifin, Smart, Hertwig, Smith, Iskandar, and Haas, 2018
Family: Rhacophoridae Hoffman, 1932 (1858)
Subfamily: Rhacophorinae Hoffman, 1932 (1858)
Genus: Chiromantis Peters, 1854
Chiromantis baladika Riyanto and Kurniati, 2014
Chiromantis nauli Riyanto and Kurniati, 2014
Chiromantis trilaksonoi Riyanto and Kurniati, 2014
Chiromantis vittiger (Boulenger, 1897)
Genus: Feihyla Frost, Grant, Faivovich, Bain, Haas, Haddad, de Sá, Channing, Wilkinson, Donnellan, Raxworthy, Campbell, Blotto, Moler, Drewes, Nussbaum, Lynch, Green, and Wheeler, 2006
Feihyla kajau (Dring, 1983)
Genus: Kurixalus Ye, Fei, and Dubois, 1999
Kurixalus appendiculatus (Günther, 1858)
Genus: Nyctixalus Boulenger, 1882
Nyctixalus margaritifer (Boulenger, 1882)
Nyctixalus pictus (Peters, 1871)
Genus: Philautus Gistel, 1848
Philautus amabilis Wostl, Riyanto, Hamidy, Kurniawan, Smith, and Harvey, 2017
Philautus aurifasciatus (Schlegel, 1837)
Philautus cornutus (Boulenger, 1920)
Philautus erythrophthalmus Stuebing and Wong, 2000
Philautus hosii (Boulenger, 1895)
Philautus ingeri Dring, 1987
Philautus jacobsoni (Van Kampen, 1912)
Philautus kerangae Dring, 1987
Philautus larutensis (Boulenger, 1900)
Philautus longicrus (Boulenger, 1894)
Philautus macroscelis (Boulenger, 1896)
Philautus mjobergi Smith, 1925
Philautus pallidipes (Barbour, 1908)
Philautus petersi (Boulenger, 1900)
Philautus polymorphus Wostl, Riyanto, Hamidy, Kurniawan, Smith, and Harvey, 2017
Philautus refugii Inger and Stuebing, 1996
Philautus tectus Dring, 1987
Philautus thamyridion Wostl, Riyanto, Hamidy, Kurniawan, Smith, and Harvey, 2017
Philautus ventrimaculatus Wostl, Riyanto, Hamidy, Kurniawan, Smith, and Harvey, 2017
Genus: Polypedates Tschudi, 1838
Polypedates colletti (Boulenger, 1890)
Polypedates iskandari Riyanto, Mumpuni, and McGuire, 2011
Polypedates leucomystax (Gravenhorst, 1829)
Polypedates macrotis (Boulenger, 1891)
Polypedates mutus (Smith, 1940)
Polypedates otilophus (Boulenger, 1893)
Polypedates pseudotilophus Matsui, Hamidy, and Kuraishi, 2014
Genus: Rhacophorus Kuhl and Van Hasselt, 1822
Rhacophorus achantharrhena Harvey, Pemberton, and Smith, 2002
Rhacophorus angulirostris Ahl, 1927
Rhacophorus barisani Harvey, Pemberton, and Smith, 2002
Rhacophorus bengkuluensis Streicher, Hamidy, Harvey, Anders, Shaney, Kurniawan, and Smith, 2014
Rhacophorus bifasciatus Van Kampen, 1923
Rhacophorus catamitus Harvey, Pemberton, and Smith, 2002
Rhacophorus cyanopunctatus Manthey and Steiof, 1998
Rhacophorus dulitensis Boulenger, 1892
Rhacophorus edentulus Müller, 1894
Rhacophorus fasciatus Boulenger, 1895
Rhacophorus gauni (Inger, 1966)
Rhacophorus georgii Roux, 1904
Rhacophorus harrissoni Inger and Haile, 1959
Rhacophorus indonesiensis Hamidy and Kurniati, 2015
Rhacophorus margaritifer (Schlegel, 1837)
Rhacophorus modestus Boulenger, 1920
Rhacophorus monticola Boulenger, 1896
Rhacophorus nigropalmatus Boulenger, 1895
Rhacophorus norhayatii Chan and Grismer, 2010
Rhacophorus pardalis Günther, 1858
Rhacophorus poecilonotus Boulenger, 1920
Rhacophorus pseudacutirostris Dehling, 2011
Rhacophorus reinwardtii (Schlegel, 1840)
Rhacophorus rufipes Inger, 1966
Genus: Theloderma Tschudi, 1838
Theloderma asperum (Boulenger, 1886)
Theloderma leporosum Tschudi, 1838

Order: Gymnophiona
Family: Ichthyophiidae Taylor, 1968
Genus: Ichthyophis Fitzinger, 1826
Ichthyophis bernisi Salvador, 1975
Ichthyophis billitonensis Taylor, 1965
Ichthyophis elongatus Taylor, 1965
Ichthyophis humphreyi Taylor, 1973
Ichthyophis hypocyaneus (Boie, 1827)
Ichthyophis javanicus Taylor, 1960
Ichthyophis monochrous (Bleeker, 1858)
Ichthyophis nigroflavus Taylor, 1960
Ichthyophis paucidentulus Taylor, 1960
Ichthyophis paucisulcus Taylor, 1960
Ichthyophis sumatranus Taylor, 1960

References 

 
Indonesia
Indonesia
amphibians